is a character from the folklore of Gifu Prefecture,  Japan. She was an old woman with supernatural powers who lived in Takayama. She used prayer to stop the eruption of a mountain after it had been rumbling for seven days, and turned the hot water of an onsen cold by throwing a horse's hoof into it.

References
Arikura-no-baba, Kaii-Yōkai Denshō Database

Japanese legendary creatures
Female legendary creatures